The Renault RE60 was a Formula One car designed by Bernard Dudot and Jean-Claude Migeot and was raced by the Renault team in the  season. The cars were driven by Patrick Tambay and Derek Warwick who had also driven for the team in 1984.

Design and development 
While the team and the Renault turbo engine had ultimately been successful in winning races they had never won either the constructors' nor drivers' championships.

Top Renault engineer Michel Tétu and four other key personnel had left the team and the entire team's employment structure had been reshuffled; this proved to be a total disaster for the Renault team. Upon getting to the Jacarepaguá circuit in Rio de Janeiro for pre-season testing, testing by Warwick proved problematic. The car proved to be 3 1/2 seconds slower than the previous year's RE50, and it was later described by Warwick as being "impossible to drive". A modified version of the car, RE60B, was introduced at the French Grand Prix but this failed to generate any better results.

Driver contracts 
Niki Lauda had signed an initial letter of intent to leave his 1984 championship-winning McLaren team and join Renault for 1985. The agreement was not implemented and Lauda stayed with McLaren for the 1985 season.

Derek Warwick’s initial contract with Renault was only for the 1984 season. During the year he was approached by the Williams team, who used turbocharged Honda engines, about driving for them in 1985 as a replacement for Jacques Laffite who was moving back to Ligier. As the results for the Honda engine had been relatively poor other than Keke Rosberg's win in the 1984 Dallas Grand Prix, Warwick felt his chances of winning were greater with Renault and he re-signed for the 1985 season, while the Williams drive eventually went to Nigel Mansell.

Racing history 
The best results were two third places for Tambay, in Portugal and San Marino, the second and third races of the season. It proved less successful than its predecessor with Tambay scoring the last two podium finishes for the team. 

Of the four teams who used the turbocharged Renault V6 engine during the season, the factory-backed Renault team were outperformed by both Lotus and fellow French team Ligier. Lotus finished fourth in the Constructors' Championship, scoring 71 points and three wins, two for Ayrton Senna and one for Elio de Angelis. Ligier finished sixth in the title with seven more points than Renault who finished seventh with just 16 points scored. Tyrrell, who only started using the Renault engines from mid-season, scored 3 points.

Aftermath 
The 1985 season proved to be the last for the factory Renault team although the Renault name would live on in Formula One with both V6 turbo and naturally aspirated V10 engines successfully supplied to various teams until Renault purchased and renamed the Benetton team at the end of 2001. Renault had decided that funding a Formula One team was not worth attempts developing technology for their road cars and the bad PR generated by their continuous failures to be competitive had been the final straw.

Ironically for Warwick, he would later regret his decision to stay in Renault as the 1985 Williams FW10 and its Honda engines won four races in 1985, including giving Mansell his first two career wins, the second of which was the South African Grand Prix that saw the French F1 teams, including the State owned Equipe Renault, boycott the race under the direction of the French Government in protest to South Africa's Apartheid policy. While Mansell would go on to ultimately win 31 races and the  World Championship in his career, Warwick's Formula One career never recovered and he would never win a Grand Prix or drive in a truly competitive car again.

Complete Formula One World Championship results
(key)

 Equipe Renault Elf boycotted the 1985 South African Grand Prix due to mounting international pressures against tolerating the country's system of apartheid. Renault's boycott was in lockstep with the French government's boycott and sanctioning of South Africa

References

Renault Formula One cars
1985 Formula One season cars